Ryania speciosa is a species of plant in the family Salicaceae.

The species is significant partly because the ryanoid insecticides are derived from, and have the same mode of action as the alkaloid ryanodine, which was originally extracted from this South American plant, which is also used as a piscicide.

Varieties
The Catalogue of Life lists these varieties:
 R. s. var. bicolor
 R. s.  var. chocoensis
 R. s.  var. minor
 R. s.  var. mutisii (extinct)
 R. s.  var. panamensis
 R. s.  var. stipularis
 R. s.  var. subuliflora
 R. s.  var. tomentella
 R. s.  var. tomentosa

References

External links

Salicaceae
Flora of Brazil